Carsten Overskov (12 August 1946 – 28 May 2015) was a Danish writer.

Overskov also wrote, produced and directed the 1984 TV series Crash.

Selected bibliography 
Swarbrick og hajerne (1980)
Det bli'r svært, Swarbrick (1981)
Det var bare ærgerligt, Swarbrick (1982)Truslen fra det sorte hul (1984)1212 (1985)Nul-timen (1986)Få mere ud af dine voksne (1987)Kæber af stål (1987)Bjørneklo (1988)Dracula - dræberen (1989)Kludder (1989)Bjergenes skønhed (1991)Hulk (1991)De andre'' (1995)

References

External links 

Carsten Overskov at litteratursiden.dk

1946 births
2015 deaths
Danish male writers